Nyhavn 55 is a just three-bays-wide,  18th-century canal house overlooking the Nyhavn Canal in central Copenhagen, Denmark. The building was listed in the Danish registry of protected buildings and places in 1918. The heritage listing comprises a half-timbered perpendicular side wing on its hear.

History

18th and early 19th centuries

The property was by 1689 as No. 18 in St. Ann's East Quarter (Sankt Annæ Øster Kvarter) owned by Borcherner Sørensen.  The building fronting the canal was constructed before 1731. It was by 1756 as No. 28 owned by skipper Hans Jacob Tofte.

At the time 1787 census, No. 28 was home to two households.  Johanne Kirstine Morthorst, a widow ropemaker, resided in the building with her late husband's son and daughter-in-law, four apprentices and two lodgers. Jan Gottlieb Brandt, a sail-maker, resided in the building with Anna Christina, their two children (aged two and fice) and a maid.

The property was later acquired by Jacob Bierregaard, a master ropemaker. At the time of the 1801 census, he resided in the building with his wife J. C. Morthorst, the 17-year-old niece J. S. Beierholm and two maids.

In the new cadastre of 1806, the property was again listed as No. 28. It was by then still owned by Jacob Bierregaard.

Quade family
 
On 28 May 1814, Nyhavn 55 (then lot no. 28) was sold in public auction to Johan Didrich Quaade for 6,136 Rigsbankdaler. J han Didrich Quaade (2 December 1776  23 December 1855), who was originally from Pommerby, Gelting, had come to Copenhagen in an early age. He started a wholesale and freight business after being licensed as a merchant (grisserer) 28 April 1813. His new property was both home to his business, himself and many other members of the Quade family.  Quade, who remained unmarried, was in the family known as "Bedsteonkel" ("Best Uncle" or "Grand Uncle"). He died in his property on 23 December 1855 and was buried from St. Peter' Church.

At the time of the 1834 census, Quade resided on the third floor of his property with one of his employees. Albrecht Christian Heinerich Quaade, one of Quade's employees, resided on the second floor with his wife Mette Helena Maria Quaade (née Haustedt) and their six children (aged 	three to 20). Margaretha Charlotte Quaade, Quade's sister and housekeeper (husjomfru), resided on the ground floor with two maids.

Quade bequeathed property and firm to his nephew Johan Peter Lorenz Quaade (18271889). In 1864, he partnered with N. C. Krake under the name J. P. Quaade & Krake. The company traded in grain and colonial goods as well as whale oil and other products from Greenland, Iceland and the Faroe Islands. In 1882, Krake left the company. In 1886, Quade's son Christian Veleur Quaade (born 1860)was made a partner in the firm which from then on traded as J. P. Quaade & Søn. At some point, Quade moved his company first to Sankt Annæ Plads 17 and then to Amaliegade 21A

Nyhavn was during the Quade family's ownership also home to other tenants than family members. The painter Heinrich Gustav Ferdinand Holm (1804-1861) was among the residents in the years around 1854.

Later history
 

The building was later operated as a hotel under the name  Hotel Kikkenborg. In 1906, Nyhavn 55 was subject to various alterations. The roof with wall dormer was in this connection replaced by a Mansard roof and display windows were installed in the ground floor. A warehouse was demolished in the yard. A haulier was later based in the building.

Architecture
The house consists of three storeys over a raised cellar and is just three bays wide. The Roof features a large wall dormer. The door in the right right-hand side of the building is raised a few steps from the street and is topped by a transom window.

Todau
The building has now been converted into condominiums. The owners are together with those from the adjacent building at No. 57 organized in E/F Nyhavn 57.

Gallery

References

Further reading
 Historiske huse i det gamle København. Nationalmuseet. 1972 (p. 20-21).
 Nygaard, Georg: Huse og mennesker. Strejftog i det gamle København. Foreningen Fremtiden. 1941 (hæfte II).
 Langberg, Harald (editor): Hvem byggede hvad. Politikens Forlag. 2.udgave. 1968 (bind 1, s. 29-30).
 Keyser, Kjeld: Københavnerbindingsværk. Nationalmuseets Købstadsundersøgelser. 1985 (p.53-54, 89, 100, 103 og 299-301).
 Minderige huse. Kraks Forlag. 1922.
 Olesen, Peter: Overraskende København''. Gyldendalske Boghandel, Nordisk Forlag A/S. 2011 (s.10-17)

External links

Listed residential buildings in Copenhagen